The Schumann–Runge bands are a set of absorption bands of molecular oxygen that occur at wavelengths between 176 and 192.6 nanometres. The bands are named for Victor Schumann and Carl Runge.

See also
Triplet oxygen
Atmospheric chemistry

References

External links

Spectroscopy
Atmospheric chemistry